Matey Dragomirov Mateev (Bulgarian: Матей Драгомиров Матеев) (10 April 1940 – 25 July 2010) was a Bulgarian professor in theoretical physics. He was a fellow of the Bulgarian Academy of Sciences.

Early life

Mateev was born in Sofia, Bulgaria. He studied nuclear physics at Sofia University where he became a research associate in the theoretical department.

Career 

He worked at Abdus Salam International Centre for Theoretical Physics (ICTP), Trieste (1967). He joined the Joint Institute for Nuclear Research in Dubna (1971–1980) where he received a Doctor of Philosophy in physics (Theoretical and Mathematical Physics) (1980).

In 1981 he became an associate professor and later a professor (highest academic rank) in 1984. From 1983 to 1985 he led the faculty of physics and was a member of the academic council and vice-rector of Sofia University from 1985 to 1986. From 1986 to 1989 Mateev was vice-chairman of the Scientific Committee for Higher Education. He was Minister of Education and Science) in the 80th and 81st cabinets (November 22, 1990 - November 8, 1991). In 2003 he was selected as an academician in physics from the Bulgarian Academy of Sciences.

Academician Mateev was editor-in-chief of the Bulgarian Journal of Physics' (BJP) and a member of the editorial board of Balkan Physics Letters''.

References

1940 births
2010 deaths
Bulgarian physicists
Members of the Bulgarian Academy of Sciences
Scientists from Sofia
Sofia University alumni
Academic staff of Sofia University